Digoniopterys is a genus in the Malpighiaceae, a family of about 75 genera of flowering plants in the order Malpighiales. Digoniopterys contains only one species, Digoniopterys microphylla, a shrub known only from shrubby vegetation on sand dunes near the southwestern coast of Madagascar.

External links
Digoniopterys
Malpighiaceae Malpighiaceae - description, taxonomy, phylogeny, and nomenclature

Malpighiaceae
Malpighiaceae genera
Monotypic Malpighiales genera